Joakim Theodor Haagaas Lystad (born 17 April 1953) is a Norwegian civil servant. He served as the first Director-General of the Norwegian Food Safety Authority from 2003 to 2010, building the organization. From 2010 to 2015, he was the Labour and Welfare Director of Norway, i.e. the head of the Labour and Welfare Service and the Labour and Welfare Administration and responsible for a third of the state budget of Norway. He is now a special adviser in the Ministry of Health and Care Services.

Background and education

Born in Oslo, he is a grandson of the physician Harald Lystad. He received his cand.agric. (MSc) degree in environmental resource management from the Norwegian College of Agriculture in 1978 with a thesis on vegetation mapping in Oaldsbygda at Sunnmøre.

Career

He worked as a researcher at the Norwegian College of Agriculture and then at the Norwegian Institute for Water Research. From 1991 to 1995 he was Assistant Director General and head of the industry department at the Ministry of the Environment, and from 1995 to 2002 he was director of planning and control at the Norwegian Pollution Control Authority.

In 2002, he was appointed by the King-in-Council as the first Director-General of the Norwegian Food Safety Authority, that was established the following year by the merger of 4 state agencies and 89 municipal agencies.

In 2010, he was appointed by the Norwegian government as head of the Norwegian Labour and Welfare Administration. He did not originally apply for the office, but was asked to take the post by minister of labour Hanne Bjurstrøm. He left the office on 10 April 2015, and was appointed as a special adviser in the Ministry of Labour. In the autumn of 2015, he was appointed as a special adviser in the Ministry of Health and Care Services. In 2017 he was appointed by the Ministry of Justice and Public Security as chairman of the working group on police reform that made recommendations on the future structure of the police force and its recruitment.

References

1953 births
Living people
Civil servants from Oslo
Norwegian College of Agriculture alumni
Directors of government agencies of Norway
Rønneberg family